Feyzabad (also Romanized as Feyẕābād and Faīzābād) is a village in Qomrud Rural District, in the Central District of Qom County, Qom Province, Iran. At the 2006 census, its population was 17, in 5 families.

References 

Populated places in Qom Province